The Hongqi E-HS3 is an electric subcompact luxury SUV manufactured by the Chinese manufacturer FAW under the Hongqi marque positioned under the Hongqi H5 mid-size sedan.

Overview

Previewed by a preproduction concept during the 2018 Beijing Auto Show, there are two versions of the powertrain, one with a single 152 hp electric motor and one with two 152 hp electric motors leading to a 304 hp for the dual-motor option.

References

External links

Hongqi Official website

E-HS3
Production electric cars
Compact sport utility vehicles
Crossover sport utility vehicles
Cars introduced in 2018
Cars of China